William Tyler (28 May 1900 – 1974) was an English professional footballer who played as a full-back.

Career
Born in Prestwich, Tyler joined Bradford City from Southport in September 1926. He made 11 league appearances for the club, before moving to Bournemouth & Boscombe Athletic on trial in October 1927.

Sources

References

1900 births
1974 deaths
English footballers
Association football fullbacks
The Beech F.C. players
New Cross F.C. players
Manchester United F.C. players
Southport F.C. players
Bradford City A.F.C. players
AFC Bournemouth players
Grimsby Town F.C. players
Ashton United F.C. players
Accrington Stanley F.C. players
Ashton National F.C. players
English Football League players